WFNX (95.3 FM; "The Otter") is a commercial FM radio station licensed to Grand Marais, Minnesota, United States, and serves the North Shore region. The station airs an Adult Album Alternative format. WFNX broadcasts with an ERP of 63,000 watts.

History
95.3 FM Grand Marais (as WXXZ), and 106.7 FM Babbitt (as KOAD) formerly simulcast KQDS-FM from Duluth. In 2017, Midwest Communications sold W288AI (Ely), WXXZ (Grand Marais) and KAOD (Babbitt) to Aurora Broadcasting LLC.

In 2017, WXXZ and KOAD both changed their callsign. WXXZ changed their callsign to WVVE, and KOAD changed their callsign to KZJZ.

In May 2018, after stunting, WVVE and KZJZ launched an adult album alternative format branded as "Radio North Of Ordinary."

In June 2019, Shire & Shore Communications announced that it would sell WVVE to Zoe Communications, Inc, however the transaction was never consummated.

On September 16, 2019, WVVE returned to air simulcasting oldies-formatted WHRY 1450 AM Hurley, WI. Its call sign was changed to WFNX on June 15, 2020.

In March 2021, the radio station, now operating as 95.3 The Otter, re-committed to its AAA format as a local, independent broadcasting company serving the Minnesota North Shore.

Sources
northpine.com
New AAA Radio Station Launches In Northeastern Minnesota
fccinfo.com
Boreal.org

References

External links

Radio stations in Minnesota
Radio stations established in 1999
1999 establishments in Minnesota
Grand Marais, Minnesota
Adult album alternative radio stations in the United States